Juan Fortuny Vidal (also spelled Joan, born 12 May 1946) is a Spanish former freestyle and medley swimmer who competed in the 1964 Summer Olympics and in the 1968 Summer Olympics.

Notes

References

External links
 
 
 
 

1946 births
Living people
Spanish male medley swimmers
Spanish male freestyle swimmers
Olympic swimmers of Spain
Swimmers at the 1964 Summer Olympics
Swimmers at the 1968 Summer Olympics
Mediterranean Games medalists in swimming
Mediterranean Games gold medalists for Spain
Mediterranean Games bronze medalists for Spain
Swimmers at the 1967 Mediterranean Games
Swimmers at the 1963 Mediterranean Games
20th-century Spanish people